Lindelofia is a genus of flowering plants belonging to the family Boraginaceae.

Its native range is Afghanistan to Mongolia and Himalaya.

Species:

Lindelofia anchusoides 
Lindelofia campanulata 
Lindelofia capusii 
Lindelofia longiflora 
Lindelofia longipedicellata 
Lindelofia micrantha 
Lindelofia olgae 
Lindelofia platycalyx 
Lindelofia stylosa 
Lindelofia tschimganica

References

Boraginoideae
Boraginaceae genera